The 1955 United Kingdom general election in Northern Ireland was held on 26 May as part of the wider general election with 12 MPs elected in single-seat constituencies using first-past-the-post.

Results
This was the first election to the House of Commons of the United Kingdom since the creation of Northern Ireland in 1921 where all constituencies in the region were contested

The Ulster Unionists regained the seat which they had lost to Jack Beattie from the Irish Labour Party. The nationalist interest was represented by Sinn Féin who gained the two seats previously held by the Nationalist Party. Patricia McLaughlin was the first woman elected as an MP for a Northern Ireland constituency.

In the election as a whole, the Conservative Party, which included the Ulster Unionists, led by Sir Anthony Eden as Prime Minister, continued in a majority government.

MPs elected

By-elections

Footnotes

References

Northern Ireland
1955
1955 elections in Northern Ireland
May 1955 events in the United Kingdom